Buffs may refer to:

 Buffs (Royal East Kent Regiment), British army regiment 1689–1961
 Buffs (football club), an early 20th-century Hong Kong team formed from players from the regiment
 Queen's Own Buffs, The Royal Kent Regiment, British Army regiment 1961–1966
 78th (Highlanders) Regiment of Foot (Ross-shire Buffs), British Army regiment 1793–1881
 Seaforth Highlanders (Ross-shire Buffs, The Duke of Albany's), British Army regiment 1881–1961
 Royal Antediluvian Order of Buffaloes, a fraternal organization
 Buffs, a company in The Queen's Own Rifles of Canada
 Colorado Buffaloes, the athletic teams of the University of Colorado Boulder
 Either of two genera of butterflies from Africa in the family Lycaenidae
 Baliochila 
 Pentila
 A nickname, particularly in Detroit, Michigan, for the buffalo horn sunglasses produced by Cartier

See also 
 Buff (disambiguation)